The Man Who Dared is a 1933 American pre-Code 
drama film directed by Hamilton MacFadden and written by Dudley Nichols and Lamar Trotti. The film stars Preston Foster, Zita Johann, Joan Marsh, Phillip Trent, and June Lang. The film was released on June 30, 1933, by Fox Film Corporation.

Plot
Jan Novak (Preston Foster) as mayor crusades to clean up a big city and fight the underworld. Jan Novak is based on Anton Cermak, the Chicago mayor killed in an assassination attempt on Franklin D. Roosevelt in 1933.

Cast 
Preston Foster as Jan Novak
Zita Johann as Teena Pavelic Novak
Joan Marsh as Joan Novak
Irén Biller as Tereza Novak
Phillip Trent as Dick
June Lang as Barbara Novak 
Leon Ames as Yosef Novak 
Douglas Cosgrove as Dan Foley
Douglass Dumbrille as Judge Collier
Frank Sheridan as Sen. 'Honest John' McGuiness
Leonid Snegoff as Posilipo
Matt McHugh as Karel
Jay Ward as young Jan Novak

References

External links 
 

1933 films
Fox Film films
American drama films
1933 drama films
Films directed by Hamilton MacFadden
American black-and-white films
1930s English-language films
1930s American films